Zoran Dimitrijević (Serbian Cyrillic: Зоран Димитријевић; born 29 August 1963) was a Serbian professional footballer.

External links
 
 forum.b92.net

1963 births
Association football defenders
Living people
Serbian footballers
Yugoslav footballers
Yugoslav First League players
Red Star Belgrade footballers
FK Radnički Niš players
OFK Beograd players
FK Mogren players